Ras-related protein Rab-33A is a protein that in humans is encoded by the RAB33A gene.

The protein encoded by this gene belongs to the small GTPase superfamily, Rab family. It is GTP-binding protein and may be involved in vesicle transport.

References

Further reading